Wiedemannia hastata is a species of dance flies, in the fly family Empididae.

References

Wiedemannia
Insects described in 1880
Diptera of Europe